Jwaji of Geumgwan Gaya (died 421) (r. 407–421) was the sixth ruler of Geumgwan Gaya, a Gaya state of ancient Korea.  He was the son of King Ipum and Queen Jeongsin.

The Samguk yusa reports that he appointed the relatives of a favoured concubine (yong nyeo, 傭女) to high office, and that this led to political trouble.  Furthermore, Silla took advantage of the kingdom's vulnerability and invaded.  After the courtier Pak Won-do (朴元道) remonstrated with him, the king went to a fortuneteller, who read him an I Ching passage which indicated that he should destroy the heart of the problem.  At that, he sent the concubine into exile and returned proper order to the court.

Family
Father: King Ipum (이품왕, 伊品王)
Mother: Lady Jeongsin (정신부인, 貞信夫人)
Wife: Lady Boksu (복수부인, 福壽夫人) – daughter of a daeagan named Doryeong (도령, 道寧).
Son: King Chwihui (취희왕, 吹希王)
Concubine, from a palace lady (용녀, 傭女)

See also 
 List of Korean monarchs
 History of Korea
 Gaya confederacy
 Three Kingdoms of Korea

References 

Gaya rulers
421 deaths
5th-century monarchs in Asia
Year of birth unknown
5th-century Korean people